Rohovládova Bělá is a municipality and village in Pardubice District in the Pardubice Region of the Czech Republic. It has about 600 inhabitants.

History
The first written mention of Bělá is from 1282 when a wooden chapel building had been set up here. The area was owned by the Bukůvka family. In 1375 was their land divided among five brothers and Bělá became property of Rohovlád Bukůvka. The village was named Bělá until 1923, when it got renamed to Rohovládova Bělá as result of a request by municipal councilors.

References

External links

Villages in Pardubice District